American football, a sport popularly called football in the US, is a type of gridiron football.

American football may also refer to:

Sports
 Football in America (disambiguation)
 Ball (American football)
 Soccer in the United States, U.S. involvement in the sport known as football in much of the world

Arts and entertainment
 American Football (band), an American indie rock band
American Football (1999 album), the second eponymous release by the band
American Football (2016 album), the third eponymous release by the band
American Football (2019 album), the fourth eponymous release by the band
 Touch Down Fever: American Football, a 1987 arcade game
 "American Football", a 1991 poem written by 2005 Nobel Laureate in Literature Harold Pinter

See also